The city of Zushi, Kanagawa Prefecture, Japan held a mayoral election on December 10, 2006. The election was won by the Democratic Party of Japan candidate, Ryūichi Hirai.

Sources 
 Japan-election coverage
 ザ・選挙 -選挙情報-

2006 elections in Japan
Mayoral elections in Japan
December 2006 events in Japan